Gondwana was a kingdom that ruled over the Gondwana region of India.  The Gondwana region includes eastern Vidarbha, Maharashtra, parts of Madhya Pradesh, and western Chhattisgarh.    Kingdom of Gondwana was ruled by Rajgonds.Rajgonds. The Rajgonds are the ruling class of the Gonds.  Gondwana named after the Gondhi tribe. The Gonds dominate the Gondwana community.  The early Kingdom of Gondwana consisted of fallow kingdoms.  South was Chanda Kingdom of Chandrapur and North Gondwana was Garha Katanga or Garhamandra Kingdom of Jabalpur.  Devgar Kingdom of Chindwala Rise as a powerful kingdom in the 16th century, with the Hela Kingdom of Betul in its western past.  Between the 14th and 18th centuries, the area was held by the powerful Gond dynasty. The Gond dynasty maintained its independence or served as a tributary chieftain during the Mughal Empire. Gond was first mentioned in his 14th-century Muslim chronicle.  Rani Durgavati – Rani Durgavati of  Gond defended his kingdom from Mughal forces.  In 1556 AD, Baz Bahadur, Sultan of Marwa, attacked the kingdom of Rani Durgavati, but Rani successfully defended it.  In 1564 Durgavat was attacked and defeated by Akbar's commander Asaph his khan.  Her tomb (near Jabalpur) is a witness to this brave queen. Wounded in her fight, rather than submit to her enemies, she stabs herself. The area larger than  stretches over northern Telangana, western Orissa and parts of Uttar her southern Pradesh.    Rani Kamlapati-Ginnor was considered an impregnable fortress perched atop a sheer 2000 foot cliff and surrounded by dense forest. Also, the area around the Upper Lake of Bhopal was mainly (1710s) Bir and inhabited by the Gond tribe.  Nizam Shah, the mightiest warlord of the Gond region, who ruled his realm from the fortress of Zinore (now Ginogar in the district of Sehor).  Ranikamlapati (or Kamlavati) was one of his seven wives of Nizamshah.  Kamlapati, famous for her beauty and talent. A local legend describes it more beautifully than Paris.  Nizam Shah was poisoned by his nephew his Alam Shah (known as Chain Shah), his Raja Chainpur-Bariand, who wanted to marry Kamlapati.  Kamlapati offered Dost Mohammad Khan 100,000 rupees to protect her honor, protect her kingdom, and avenge her husband's death.  Mohammad Khan led a combined army of Afghan and Gond soldiers who defeated and killed Alam Shah. Khan accepted the offer and Kamlapati also tied a rakhi in his hand.  The kingdom was incorporated into the Kingdom of Kamlapati in place of the remaining kingdoms. Rani didn't have 100,000 rupees, so she paid him half the amount and gave the village to Bhopal.  Rani Kamlapathi committed suicide near his palace (now Kamla Park, Bhopal) in 1723 and Dost initially ruled the Ginoor Fort, loyal to Rani's son Nawal Shah, who was invited to live in the fort. disguised as  Mohammad Khan disguised his 100 soldiers as women and sent them to Zinore and Doris to house his wife.

History and origin

The Dao Jamat are drawn from the largest tribal grouping in India, the Gond ethnic group. They are descended from the family and close kinsmen of Rajgond who converted to Islam about three hundred years ago. The community descend from Raja Bhagtu Shah, the ruler of the state of Deogarh, who converted to Islam. He took the Muslim name Shaikh Bakht Buland Goindi. The principality was taken over by the Bhonsle Marathas in the 18th century.

Present circumstances

The Muslim Raj Gond are found mainly in the city of Nagpur, living mainly in the Dao Mandi area. In addition, they are also found in the village Matkajheri in Nagpur District. They are also found in the districts of Narmadapuram, Betul, Balaghat, Seoni, and Raisen. The community is endogamous, although there are cases of marriage with the Mughal, Shaikh and Momin Ansari communities. They are now called Mughal Goindis or Shaikh Goindis. They have also given up the historic practice of clan exogamy. Like other Muslim communities in Maharashtra, they have come under the influence of the Tableeghi Jamat. There has also been a movement towards adoption of Urdu, and the use of the Gondi language has almost disappeared.

See also
 Tadvi Bhils

References

Social groups of Maharashtra
Muslim communities of India
Scheduled Tribes of India
Social groups of Madhya Pradesh
Muslim communities of Maharashtra